Frank Charles Hayes (born 6 December 1946) is a former English cricketer, who played in nine Test matches and six One Day Internationals from 1973 to 1976. He made an unbeaten 106 in his first Test appearance, becoming the thirteenth man to score a century on debut for England, but in eight further Tests (all against the West Indies) his highest score was a mere 29.

For Lancashire he had more success. He made 94 on his first-class debut in the 1970 season, seven years later hit Malcolm Nash for 34 runs in an over (6-4-6-6-6-6) and captained the Lancashire side from 1978 to 1980. He retired in 1984.

Hayes was later director of cricket at Oakham School.

References

External links

1946 births
Living people
Cheshire cricketers
Cricketers at the 1975 Cricket World Cup
Cricketers from Preston, Lancashire
Cricketers who made a century on Test debut
D. H. Robins' XI cricketers
England One Day International cricketers
England Test cricketers
English cricketers
Lancashire cricket captains
Lancashire cricketers
Marylebone Cricket Club cricketers
Young England cricketers